Kilakarai (alternatively spelled Kilakkarai or Keelakarai) is a municipality in Ramanathapuram district in the Indian state of Tamil Nadu. As of 2011, the town had a population of 38,355. Kilakarai is one of the Taluka in Ramanathapuram District.

History 
Kilakarai is an eastern coastal town and a port, located in southern Tamil Nadu. It was a flourishing seaport and a gateway to places as far as Madurai until the early 20th century. The famous pearl belt known as the Gulf of Mannar in the Bay of Bengal is dotted with small islands Appa Tivu, Nallathanni Theevu, Shuli Tivu, Uppu Tanni Tivu, Talari Tivu and Musal Tivu. The coastal line of Kilakarai is formed by a series of small bays and coral reefs sheltering the town from the ocean. It was also called as "Quilicare", kirkari, Sembi Nadu, Korkai, Powthira Manicka Pattinam, "Kelikkarai", "Ninathaan mudithaan pattinam", "Seppi Nadu", "lebbat pattan" (pattan mentioned in voyages of Ibn Battuta & map displayed in Ibn Battuta Mall). A strong cultural connection exists between Kayalpatnam, Adirampattinam and Kilakarai.

The prime occupations of the people were pearl, conch, sea trade and transport. The mid-20th century saw a decline in the occupations of the people of Kilakarai, with the advent of surface transport the merchant shipping fleets declined and Kilakarai aka Killikare ceased to be a harbour and port. The cultured pearl industry and dragnet fishing that destroyed the coral reefs choked the once robust pearl trade, or Muthu Salabam. The conch and coral industries declined due to new regulations and restrictions. 

Kilakarai is renowned for its communal harmony. The majority of the population here is Muslim with people of other faith Hindu, Christians living together. The communal harmony that always existed is best exemplified by the famous Rameswaram Ramanathaswamy Temple and  Kilakarai Jumma Pallivasal (Vallal Seethakathi is interred here) at Kilakarai, while the architecture is the same the workforce was provided by the erstwhile ruler Sethupathi of Ramnad and most of the materials for both the edifice were supplied by the Kilakarai merchant navies. The town is reminiscent of Spanish Moorish architecture and is located about 60 km south west of the temple town of Rameswaram.

It has the oldest mosque in India known as the Palaiya Kuthba Palli. It has a unique pre-Islamic heritage of more than 1300 years. The Kilakarai Muslims or Kilakarai Moors form 80% of the population of Kilakarai. Ibnu Batutah once said in his travel notes "it's the place where most Arab settlers live and he was surprised to see them living as in Arab land".

The migration of the people after the decline of the marine trade and industry resulted in people exploring the other parts of the globe. Kilakarai has a large expatriate population and a high literacy rate. This has enabled the people of Kilakarai to span the globe and become active merchants in the Middle and Far East, US and European markets.

Hameedia Primary School was started as a Madrasa in the year 1870, and gradually became a Thinnai Palli and became a registered School in 1938 due to the efforts of K.T.M. Hussain Sahib, fondly known as Haajiaar. This school is completing its sesquicentennial year (150th year) in 2020.  The Hameedia Primary School Alumni Association - (HPSAA) consists of great stalwarts of Kilakarai including the founders of ETA, Crescent, Sathak Group and more than 100 institutions and business enterprises worldwide.

The 1970s decline of marine trade resulted in people migrating to other countries for business and jobs. Now as per the law of nature the reverse migration is all set to happen. Post-Covid, pandemic and Lockdowns job losses have become the order of the day and disruptions are all set to happen. The Gulf mission to minimise the Indian immigrants, improved and fast-developing job and business opportunities in Tamil Nadu, the native bonding, self-content nature etc. have made many people come back home for good.

This year- 2022 edition is being planned during December 2022 at Kilakarai.

Hameedia High School founded in 1940s beside the old Arabic Madrasa Aroosiya Thaika, was a catalyst to more graduates from Kilakarai. With the arrival of Mohamed Sathak Engineering College and then the Thassim Beevi Abdul Kader College for Women the number of graduates from this traditional town has seen a steady rise.

Kilakarai was constituted as a panchayat in the year 1885. As per G.O. No. 1157LN, date: 3 December 1885. It has since been upgraded as a Special Town Panchayat as per Director of Town Panchayat, Madras as per G.O. No. 1481/82/J5, Dated on 25 January 1982 and then upgraded as per G.O. No. 300 and 301 Dated on 24 August 2004 as a Third Grade Municipality.

The Muslim community of Kilakarai is philanthropic in nature, with assistance given to downtrodden sections of society, such as Dalits in Tirunelveli.

Demographics 

According to 2011 census, Keelakarai had a population of 38,355 with a sex-ratio of 948 females for every 1,000 males, much above the national average of 929. A total of 4,391 were under the age of six, constituting 2,204 males and 2,187 females. The average literacy of the town was 82.63%, compared to the national average of 72.99%. The town had a total of : 7448 households. There were a total of 12,033 workers, comprising 29 cultivators, 47 main agricultural labourers, 165 in house hold industries, 10,765 other workers, 1,027 marginal workers, 15 marginal cultivators, 18 marginal agricultural labourers, 38 marginal workers in household industries and 956 other marginal workers.
As per the religious census of 2011, Keelakarai had 79.92% Muslims, 17.6% Hindus, 1.16% Christians, 0.01% Sikhs, 0.01% Jains, and 1.31% following other religions.

Educational institutions

Schools 
 Hairathul Jalaliah Higher Secondary School – East street
 Magdoomiah High School – OJM Street
 Kannadi Vappa International School – Kanjirangudi
 Hameediah Matriculation Higher Secondary School – West Street
 Islamiah Matriculation Higher secondary school – South Street
 Islamiah High School – South Street
 Mohaideeniah Matriculation Higher secondary school – North street
 Sathakathun Jariyah Middle School – Middle Street
 Hameediyah Boys Higher Secondary School – Mulluvadi
 Hameediyah Girls Higher Secondary School – West Street
 Hameediah Primary School – West Street . founded in 1870 
 Nooraniah Matriculation School – New Street
 Dheeniyah Matriculation Higher Secondary School – East Street
 Pearl Matriculation School – Kilakarai
 Al Bayyinah Matriculation School – East Street
 P.s.Subramanian Jayalakshmi Nadar Matriculation School - Kilakarai

Colleges 
 Mohamed Sathak Engineering College
 Thassim Beevi Abdul Kader College for Women
 Syed Hameedha Arts and Science College
 Mohamed Sathak Polytechnic College
 Mohamed Sathak I.T.I (Industrial Training Institute)
 Arusiyyah Arabic College
 Syed Hameedha Arabic College
 Bukhari Aalim Arabic College

Photo gallery

Notes

References 
 
 

Cities and towns in Ramanathapuram district